The Four Soldiers is a Canadian drama film, directed by Robert Morin and released in 2013. Adapted from the novel Quatre soldats by Hubert Mingarelli, the film centres on Dominique (Camille Mongeau), Mateo (Christian de la Cortina), Max (Antoine Bertrand) and Kevin (Aliocha Schneider), four soldiers in a civil war who find a secluded pond that becomes a refuge from the stresses and horrors of fighting.

The cast also includes Antoine L'Écuyer, Gaston Caron, Rémy Ouellet, Jean-Pierre Bergeron, Richard Lalancette, Lizandra Rodriguez-Olano, Pete White, Christopher Kinsella, Derek Lanni and Charles S. Métellus.

The film premiered at the Fantasia Film Festival on August 5, 2013, before going into theatrical release on August 16. At Fantasia, it won the Prix Public for Best Canadian Film.

The film received two Jutra Award nominations at the 16th Jutra Awards in 2014, for Best Hairstyling (Denis Parent) and Best Makeup (Kathryn Casault).

References

External links

2013 films
2013 drama films
Canadian war drama films
Films shot in Quebec
Films directed by Robert Morin
French-language Canadian films
2010s Canadian films